Yuliya Samoylova may refer to:

 Yuliya Samoylova (countess) (1803–1875), Russian countess
 Yuliya Samoylova (singer) (born 1989), contemporary Russian singer